John Anthony Brohamer (born February 26, 1950) is a former Major League Baseball (MLB) player.

Career
Brohamer was drafted by the Cleveland Indians in the 34th round of the 1967 amateur draft. He recorded a base hit in his first major league at-bat on April 18, 1972, as his Indians lost 4–2 to the Red Sox. He was a Cleveland Indians player for four seasons before being traded to the Chicago White Sox for Larvell Blanks on December 12, 1975.

Brohamer played both second and third base while in Chicago, collecting 128 hits over two seasons and hitting for the cycle on September 24, 1977. He is also the only player in MLB history to hit a home run while wearing uniform shorts, having done so off Rudy May in the White Sox's 12-inning 11–10 victory over the Baltimore Orioles at Comiskey Park on August 21, 1976. He signed as a free agent with the Boston Red Sox on November 30, 1977.

His contract was purchased by the Cleveland Indians on June 20, 1980, and Brohamer finished his career with the team that drafted him. His final major league appearance came at Cleveland Stadium on September 28, 1980, going 1-for-4 in a 5–3 loss to the Baltimore Orioles.

See also
 List of Major League Baseball players to hit for the cycle

References

Further reading

External links
, or Retrosheet

1950 births
Living people
Baseball players from California
Cleveland Indians players
Chicago White Sox players
Boston Red Sox players
Major League Baseball second basemen